Edwin Sandys (25 October 1642 – 8 October 1705) was  an English Anglican priest in the late 17th and early 18th centuries.

Sandys was  educated at Magdalen College, Oxford. He was a Fellow at Magdalen from 1665 to 1672. He held the living at Yeovilton with Puddimore. Sandys was Archdeacon of Wells from 1684 until his death on 8 October 1705.

Notes

1642 births
1705 deaths
17th-century English Anglican priests
16th-century English Anglican priests
Archdeacons of Wells
Alumni of Magdalen College, Oxford